{{Infobox comics character
|image=
|caption=
|character_name=Night Man
|real_name=Johnny Domino
|species=Human mutate
|publisher=Malibu Comics  Marvel Comics
|debut=The Strangers" #1 (as Johnny Domino); "The Night Man" # 1 (as Night Man)
|creators=Steve EnglehartRick Hoberg
|alliances=Freex
|aliases= 
|powers=*Malicious telepathy
Night vision 
Infra-red vision via mask 
Sleeplessness
Neural resistance
Use of Celtic Magick 
Skilled martial artist and gymnast
}}

Night Man is a fictional superhero created by Steve Englehart and Rick Hoberg, who exists in the Ultraverse line of comics and possesses the super ability to hear the evil thoughts of those people around him. His real name is Johnny Domino, a talented San Francisco saxophonist. He was adapted in an live-action superhero television series from 1997 to 1999.

Publication history
The Night Man appeared as a civilian in The Strangers #1 (June 1993) and became an superhero in Night Man #1 (Oct. 1993), written by Steve Englehart and illustrated by Darick Robertson. As part of the Ultraverse imprint, the comic was set within a shared universe of super-powered beings called the Ultraverse and published by Malibu Comics.

The character was depicted in his own series, that lasted 23 issues from October 1993 to August 1995. After the Black September event, The Night Man was relaunched in a new series that lasted 5 issues, from September to December 1995. He had a crossover with Wolverine in the One shot Night Man Vs Wolverine published in August 1995. Finally the character was depicted in a limited series of three issues called Night Man/Gambit that lasted from March to May 1996, in that the Night Man teamed up with Gambit from Marvel Comics.

Fictional biography
John  E. Domingo  was a professional saxophone player who took the stage name Johnny Domino. He was living in San Francisco when his Miata  car was hit by a runaway cable car. The cable car was struck by strange lighting, called the Jumpstart effect, a  burst of energy that gave humans ultra-powers. As a result, John Domingo and all those aboard the cable car were transformed into Ultras. Johnny become seriously injured by the car crash and was in coma for several weeks. The doctors do not believe in his survival because a fragment of shrapnel was embedded in his brain. However Johnny lived and acquired the ability to hear evil thoughts of those people around him. Also his eyes were permanently dilated, giving him incredible night vision. Finally his brain has been altered and he had prolonged insomnia. He become a costumed vigilante and called himself the Night Man.

He tried to save a girl who was in danger of murder by one criminal, but he arrived too late. Then Johnny fought an ultra criminal called Mangle who was murdering young boys and was searching for the son of the industrialist I.D. Hunt. When the Night Man tried to help the boy, I.D. Hunt Jr. he discovered that he was a psychopath. When a night of madness descended upon San Francisco, the Night man was looking for Mangle'', and met the group of teen ultras called the Freex, who were fooled by Mangle in a quest of revenge from I.D. Hunt. Johnny managed to defeat Mangle with a gun and became an ally of the Freex.
Later he fought the Celtic sorceress Rhiannon, when she was killing young people to absorb their energies and continue her long life. Rhiannon proposed to the Night Man that he should join her as her consort, but he refused. After the battle, Rhiannon disappeared.
He was separated into two people by Rhiannon. The normal Night Man was transported to the Marvel Universe when the Black September event happened.

In other media
Night Man guest starred in the episode "Night and the Night Man" of Ultraforce animated series. The character's origin is the same, but instead of the face stealing serial killer Deathmask being the cause of Johnny Domino becoming Night Man, a completely new villain is. Chrysalis, a mutated insect who takes the form of whomever it captures in a chrysalis, targets local businessman Roger Tremain, due to believing itself to be his stepdaughter, Elly. During a fight with Chrysalis, Johnny is teleported to UltraForce's headquarters, where Contrary attempts to recruit him onto the team. However, Johnny turns them down, due to Contrary being more focused on another case. But he does take up her idea about a "career change", and creates the alter ego of Night Man to battle Chrysalis. In the episode's climax, as Chrysalis takes Hardcase's form, Night Man battles Chrysalis and Chrysalis hits a tower, which electrocutes it and frees its victims. Chrysalis is defeated, but manages to escape, while its victims are released, and Elly, having learned about her stepfather's cruelty through some sort of psychic link Chrysalis had with its victims, takes over her mother's company from him.
Glen A. Larson developed for television a live-action series based on the character, starring Matt McColm as Johnny Domino, that aired in syndication from September 15, 1997, to May 17, 1999. Night Man's creator, Steve Englehart, wrote three episodes for the show.

Possibility of revival
In 2003, Steve Englehart was commissioned by Marvel to relaunch the Ultraverse with the most recognizable characters, including the Night Man, but the editors ultimately decided not to resurrect the imprint.
In June 2005, when asked by Newsarama whether Marvel had any plans to revive the Ultraverse (including the Night Man), Marvel editor-in-chief Joe Quesada replied that:

References

Comics characters introduced in 1994
Fictional cannibals
Fictional characters with electric or magnetic abilities
Fictional knife-fighters
Marvel Comics characters who use magic
Marvel Comics characters who can teleport
Marvel Comics mutates
Marvel Comics telepaths
Malibu Comics titles
Ultraverse